Kelly Gibson (born May 2, 1964) is an American professional golfer who played on the PGA Tour and the Nationwide Tour.

Gibson joined the Nationwide Tour in 1990. He won the Ben Hogan Tri-Cities Open in 1991 and also earned his PGA Tour card that year through qualifying school. In his rookie year on the PGA Tour, Gibson finished 105th on the money list while recording three top-10 finishes. He finished 110th on the money list in 1993. In 1994 he recorded two top-10 finishes while finishing 129th on the money list, four spots shy of retaining full-time status on the Tour but he went to qualifying school and earned his card for 1995. He finished 109th on the money list in 1995 while recording one top-10 finish. His best year on Tour came in 1996 when he finished 69th on the money list while recording two top-10 finishes. He finished in a tie for third at the Las Vegas Invitational, his best finish on Tour in his career. His success continued in 1997 when he finished 92nd on the money list with a top-10 finish and also finished in a tie for 28th at the U.S. Open. His performance fell off in 1998, he finished 139th on the money list earning only partial status on Tour for 1999 and spent most of his time that year on the Nationwide Tour. He won the Nike Oregon Classic that year and recorded six top-10 finishes en route to a 13th-place finish on the money list, earning him his PGA Tour card for 2000. In his return to the PGA Tour he only made 12 cuts out of 30 events entered so he returned to the Nationwide Tour for 2001. He split time between Tours from 2002 to 2004 and played in a limited number of tournaments after that.

Gibson created the Kelly Gibson Foundation in 2005 to support Hurricane Katrina relief efforts. He also created a Junior Golf Tour in 2009.

Professional wins (4)

Nike Tour wins (2)

Canadian Tour wins (2)
1989 Victoria Open
1991 Manitoba Open

Results in major championships

CUT = missed the half-way cut
"T" = tied
Note: Gibson never played in the Masters Tournament or The Open Championship.

See also
1991 PGA Tour Qualifying School graduates
1994 PGA Tour Qualifying School graduates
1999 Nike Tour graduates

External links

The Kelly Gibson Foundation official site

American male golfers
Lamar Cardinals golfers
PGA Tour golfers
Korn Ferry Tour graduates
Golfers from Louisiana
Sportspeople from New Orleans
1964 births
Living people